Jean-Claude Éloy (born 15 June 1938) is a French composer of instrumental, vocal and electroacoustic music.

Biography
Jean-Claude Éloy was born in Mont-Saint-Aignan near Rouen. He studied composition with Darius Milhaud at the Paris Conservatory, where he was awarded four premier prix: in piano (1957), in chamber music (1958), in counterpoint (1959), and in ondes Martenot (1960). During this same period he attended the Darmstädter Ferienkurse in 1957, 1960, and 1961, where he studied with Henri Pousseur, Hermann Scherchen, Olivier Messiaen, Pierre Boulez, and Karlheinz Stockhausen. In 1961, he also studied with Boulez at the City of Basel Music Academy.

In 1966, he joined the faculty of the University of California, Berkeley, where he taught until 1968. At Stockhausen's invitation, he spent 1972–73 working at the Studio for Electronic Music (WDR) in Cologne, where he produced Shânti (revised in 1974), for electronic and concrete sounds, in which he explored timbre and aspects of musical time. In 1977, Éloy spent long periods of time in Japan, realizing one of the high-points in his electronic-music output, the nearly four-hour-long Gaku-no-Michi (The Dào [Paths] of Music), at the Electronic Music Studio of NHK in Tokyo, and from 1978 he worked at the Centre d'Études de Mathématiques et Automatique Musicales, founded by Iannis Xenakis.

In the late 1980s, Éloy embarked on a cycle of compositions collectively titled Libérations, focussing on women or the feminine principle, and developed in collaboration with exceptional vocalists such as Junko Ueda, Fátima Miranda, and Yumi Nara. Each work is devoted to one or another feminine figure from mythology, literature, or cultural history, and features female solo voices with instruments and/or electro-acoustics. The first two works of the cycle, Sappho Hikètis (The Imploring Sappho) and Butsumyôe (Ceremony of Repentance) were composed in 1989. These were followed in 1990–91 by Erkos (Hymn of Praise), then by Gaia Songs (1991–92), and finally Galaxies (Sigma version 1996). In 2011, the composer decided to retitle the cycle Chants pour l'autre moitié du ciel [Songs for the Other Half of the Sky], subtitled Songs of Loneliness, of Supplication, of Revolt, of Celebrations, or of Prayers.

Éloy founded his own publishing house and record company, hors territoires, with the aim of documenting his artistic work through the publication of books and compact discs.

Style and technique
Through most of his career, Asian (especially Hindu) music and aesthetics have had a strong influence on Éloy's music. In some earlier works, Fibonacci numbers played a part – in a very obvious way in Équivalences, where fermatas are assigned values of ½, 1, 1½, 2½, 4, and 6½ seconds, and disguised by arbitrary arithmetic transformations in the rhythms of the withdrawn composition Macles.

Regarding Équivalences (1963), the composer stated:

Works (selection) 

 Nocturne, for piano (1954)
 Stèle pour Omar Khayyam, for soprano, piano, harp, and percussion (1960)
 Étude III, for orchestra, with five percussions, celesta, harp, and piano (1962)
 Équivalences, for 18 players (1963)
 Faisceaux-Diffractions, for 28 players (1970)
 Kâmakalâ ("Le Triangle des énergies"), for three orchestral groups, five choral groups, with three conductors (1971)
 Shânti ("Paix"), for electronic and concrete sounds (1972–73)
 Fluctuante-Immuable, for large orchestra (1977)
 Gaku-no-Michi ("Les Voies de la musique" or "Le Tao de la musique"), film without images for electronic and concrete sounds (1977–78); realized at the NHK Electronic Music Studio, Tokyo
 Yo-In ("Réverbérations"), théâtre sonore for an imaginary ritual in four acts, for electronic and concrete sounds (1980); realized at the Instituut voor Sonologie, Rijkuniversiteit, Utrecht
 A l'approche du feu méditant, for 27 players of a Japanese gagaku orchestra, two choruses of Buddhist monks from the Tendai and Shingon sects, six percussionists, and five bugaku dancers (1983); commissioned by the National Theater of Japan (Kokuritsu Gekijo), Tokyo
 Anâhata ("Vibration primordiale" or "Vibration d’origine"), for five Japanese traditional musicians (three gagaku players and two Shômyô singers), percussion, electronic and concrete sounds, staging and lights (1984–86); commissioned by the Festival d’Automne à Paris
 Libérations (1989, renamed Chants pour l'autre moitié du ciel [Songs for the Other Half of the Sky] in 2011); commissioned by the Festival d’Automne à Paris
 Butsumyôe ("La cérémonie du repentir"), for two female voices (sopranos with extended vocal techniques, using varied percussion instruments)
 Sappho hiketis ("Sappho implorante"), for two female voices (sopranos with extended vocal techniques), and electroacoustic music
 Erkos ("Chant, Louange"), for a solo Satsuma-Biwa player using vocal extended techniques and several percussion instruments, with electroacoustic music (1990–91); commissioned by the Westdeutscher Rundfunk and realized at the WDR Studio for Electronic Music, Cologne
 Galaxies (Sigma version), with the vocal solo ...kono yo no hoka... ("... ce monde au-delà ..."), for a vocalist using extended Shômyô vocal techniques, with electroacoustic music, light and staging (1996); commissioned by Roger Lafosse for the festival Sigma and realized at the Electronic music studio of the Sweelinck Conservatory, Amsterdam
 L'Anneau des sept lumières [The Ring of the Seven Lights]; Metametal (long version). Seven continuous variations from a single Bonshô sample, for electronic and concrete sounds (1994–95, revision and new master 2013)
 Etats-Limites, ou les cris de Petra [Borderlines, or Petra's Shouts], for electronic and concrete sounds (2013)
 Le Minuit de la Foi [The Midnight of the Faith], for electronic and concrete sounds (2014)

Notes

References

Further reading

 Blumröder, Christoph von. 2017. Die elektroakustische Musik: Eine kompositorische Revolution und ihre Folgen. Signale aus Köln, Beiträge zur Musik der Zeit 22, Vienna: Verlag Der Apfel .
 Chauvin, Marie-José (1971). "Entretien avec Jean-Claude Eloy". Courrier musical de France 36 (October–December).
 Deloche, Aimée-Catherine (1985). "Eloy, le temps revisité". Silences 1:159–167.
 Éloy, Jean-Claude (1969). "Musiques d'Orient, notre univers familier". In La musique dans la vie 2 ("Rayonnement des cultures africaines, regards sur les civilisations asiatiques, quelques problèmes du monde actuel"), 183–215. Paris: ORTF.
 Éloy, Jean-Claude (1970). "Improvisation: Refuge, utopia or necessity?" The World of Music/Die Welt der Musik/Le Monde de la musique 12, no. 3:6–21. [In English, German and French.]
 Éloy, Jean-Claude (1995). "L'autre versant des sons: Vers de nouvelles frontières des territoires de la musique? " In La musique et le monde (Internationale de l'imaginaire, nouvelle serie 4), edited by Françoise Gründ, 193–231. Arles: Actes Sud. .
 Éloy, Jean-Claude (2006). "From Kâmakalâ to Shânti". In Komposition und Musikwissenschaft im Dialog V (2001–2004), edited by Imke Misch and Christoph von Blumröder, 23–53. Signale aus Köln, Musik der Zeit 11. Münster, Berlin, Hamburg, London, Vienna: Lit-Verlag. .
 Éloy, Jean-Claude (2013). "Cheminement", letter to Leopoldo Siano, 21 August 2011, German translation by Monika Lichtenfeld. Reproduced within . Musik Texte, no. 139 (November): 27.
 Felder, John (1981). "The Structural Function of Wind Role Transformations in Equivalences by J. C. Eloy." Ex Tempore: A Journal of Compositional and Theoretical Research in Music 1, no. 1:18–35
 Green, Tona (1991). "Interview with Jean-Claude Éloy". Computer Music Journal 15, no. 1 (Spring): 14–19.
 Mâche, François-Bernard (1963). "Une oeuvre nouvelle de Messiaen". Mercure de France 1202 (December), 828–831. Reprinted in François-Bernard Mâche, Un demi-siècle de musique...et toujours contemporaine, Collection sémiotique et philosophie de la musique (Paris: L'Harmattan, 2000), 28–31. [discusses Jean-Claude Éloy's Équivalences as well as Messiaen's Sept haïkaï]
 Morawska-Büngeler, Marietta. 1988. Schwingende Elektronen. Eine Dokumentation über das Studio für Elektronische Musik des Westdeutschen Rundfunks in Köln 1951–1986. Cologne-Rodenkirchen: P. J. Tonger. .
 Rockwell, John (19 November 1983). "Music: Jean-Claude Eloy". The New York Times.
 Stoianova, Ivanka (1993). "Mythen der Weiblichkeit in der achtziger und neunziger Jahren: Stockhausen, Eloy", Wiederaneignung und Neubestimmung, der Fall ‘Postmoderne’ in der Musik (Studien zur Wertungsforschung), ed. Otto Kolleritsch, 87–116. Vienna: Universal Edition.
 Stoianova, Ivanka (1997). "Jean-Claude Éloy: à la recherche du feu méditant: portrait du compositeur". In Music and Sciences, ed. G.F. Arlandi, 196–227. Bochum.
 Stoianova, Ivanka (2003). "Produktion und Reproduktion in der elektronischen Musik am Beispiel von Jean-Claude Eloy". In Musikalische Produktion und Interpretation: Zur historischen Unaufhebbarkeit einer ästhetischen Konstellation (Studien zur Wertungsforschung 43), ed. Otto Kolleritsch, 163–175. Vienna: Universal Edition.
 Stoianova, Ivanka (2004). Entre détermination et aventure: Essais sur la musique de la deuxième moitié du XXème siècle. Paris: Editions l'Harmattan.
 Weid, Jean-Noël von der (1997). "La cosmogonie sonore de Jean-Claude Éloy". Dissonanz, no.51:30–32. English translation from the composer's website
 Young, Rob (2010). "Jean-Claude Eloy: Shânti, Hors Territoires 2 × CD; Gaku-No-Michi, Hors Territoires 4 × CD". The Wire, no. 321 (28 October): 57.

External links
 
 
 
 
 Books revues, interviews, recordings, scores, memories
 hors territoires Books and Cds
 hors territoires Texts
 Musical examples
 Fruitman, Stephen (2012). "Jean-Claude Eloy: 4View (Hors Territoires)" CD review, Igloomag.com

French classical composers
French male classical composers
French music theorists
20th-century classical composers
21st-century classical composers
Electroacoustic music composers
Ondists
1938 births
Living people
People from Mont-Saint-Aignan
Pupils of Darius Milhaud
Pupils of Karlheinz Stockhausen
French male writers